HD 33463 is a suspected variable star in the northern constellation of Auriga, about 1,050 light years away. It is a red giant star with a stellar classification of M2III, and has expanded away from the main sequence after exhausting its core hydrogen.

Hipparcos satellite data showed possible variations in the apparent magnitude of HD 33463 and it was given the suspected variable star designation NSV 16257.  Observations with MASCARA, a camera designed to detect exoplanets, show brightness variations with a maximum amplitude of 21 thousandths of a magnitude and a period slightly less than a day.

References

External links
 HIC 24193
 Image HD 33463

Auriga (constellation)
033463
024193
M-type giants
Suspected variables
Durchmusterung objects